Victory is a 1996 French-German drama suspense film written and directed by Mark Peploe and starring Willem Dafoe, Irène Jacob, Sam Neill and Rufus Sewell. It is based on the 1915 novel of the same name by Joseph Conrad.

The novel had been adapted into film on multiple previous occasions, including a 1919 silent version directed by Maurice Tourneur and featuring Jack Holt, Seena Owen, Lon Chaney Sr., and Wallace Beery; the 1930 William Wellman directed Dangerous Paradise starring Nancy Carroll, Richard Arlen and Warner Oland; and the 1940 version featuring Fredric March, Betty Field, and Sir Cedric Hardwicke.

Plot summary
Through a business misadventure, the European Axel Heyst (Willem Dafoe) ends up living on an island in what is now Indonesia with a Chinese assistant Wang (Ho Li). Heyst visits a nearby island where a female band is playing at a hotel owned by Mr. Schomberg. Schomberg attempts to force himself sexually on one of the band members, Alma (Irène Jacob). Alma is about to be sold to Schomberg by the corrupt leader/director of the band who has enslaved the women for prostitution. She begs Heyst to help her. Having sworn off close relationships because of his past, he is challenged by her request, but agrees to help her. He escapes from the island with Alma, and they go back to his island and eventually become lovers. Schomberg seeks revenge by attempting to frame Heyst for the "murder" of a man who had died of natural causes and later by sending three desperadoes Pedro, Martin Ricardo (Rufus Sewell), and Mr. Jones (Sam Neill) to Heyst's island with a lie about treasure hidden on the island. Upon their arrival at the island, much intrigue ensues. In a climactic scene, Jones kills Pedro and then Ricardo; Alma is also shot and dies in the arms of Axel. After burning his compound and burying Alma, Axel disappears from the island but is rumored to have later been seen as a drifter in San Francisco and other ports of call. Alma's victory, in death, is having saved Axel's life in that he has again made connections with others.

Cast
 Willem Dafoe as Axel Heyst
 Sam Neill as Mr. Jones
 Irène Jacob as Alma
 Rufus Sewell as Martin Ricardo
 Jean Yanne as Mr. Schomberg
 Ho Yi as Wang
 Bill Paterson - Capt. Davidson
 Irm Hermann - Mrs. Schomberg
 Graziano Marcelli - Pedro
 Hansi Jochmann - Mrs. Zangiacomo
 Simon Callow - Zangiacomo
 Michael Lee - Chinese Gentleman
 Leonard Maguire - Old Trader McNab

Production
The principal photography of the movie were done at Situbondo and Asembagus regency in East Java, Indonesia. Some depiction of old Surabaya were also done in the same place.

References

External links 
 
 
 

1996 films
French drama films
German drama films
Films based on British novels
Films based on works by Joseph Conrad
Films set in the 1910s
1990s historical drama films
Films set in Indonesia
British historical drama films
English-language French films
English-language German films
1996 drama films
1990s British films
1990s French films
1990s German films